The list of shipwrecks in June 1877 includes ships sunk, foundered, grounded, or otherwise lost during June 1877.

1 June

2 June

4 June

5 June

{{shipwreck list item
|ship=Esther 
|flag=
|desc=The sloop foundered in the Irish Sea off the Great Orme Head, Caernarfonshire. Both crew were rescued by the pilot boat Perseverance'.
}}

6 June

7 June

9 June

10 June

11 June

12 June

13 June

 

14 June

15 June

16 June

17 June

18 June

 

19 June

20 June

21 June

 

22 June

24 June

25 June

26 June

27 June

28 June

29 June

30 June

Unknown date

References

Bibliography
Ingram, C. W. N., and Wheatley, P. O., (1936) Shipwrecks: New Zealand disasters 1795–1936.'' Dunedin, NZ: Dunedin Book Publishing Association.

1877-06
Maritime incidents in June 1877